Rangeley is a town in Franklin County, Maine, United States. The population was 1,222 at the 2020 census. Rangeley is the center of the Rangeley Lakes Region, a resort area. The town includes the villages of Rangeley and Oquossoc, as well as the communities of Mooselookmeguntic, Bald Mountain, Mountainview, and South Rangeley.

History

It is named after an Englishman, Squire James Rangeley, who inherited a  tract bought from Massachusetts in 1796 by his father. He arrived in 1825 to establish an estate based on the English system of landlord and tenants, also giving extensive land to settlers. He built a sawmill, a gristmill, a two-story mansion, and a ten-mile (16 km) road to connect his property with the rest of the world. Rangeley resided here for 15 years, then sold the property and moved to Portland.

Farms produced hay, wheat, oats, barley and potatoes, with cattle grazing the hills. Logging became a principal industry, with booms of logs towed by steamboat across the Rangeley lakes, then guided down rivers in log drives. On March 29, 1855, the town of Rangeley was set off and incorporated from a portion of Rangeley Plantation. By 1870, the population was 313. In 1886, it had twenty dwellings, two hotels, two stores and a post office. Industries included a carriage shop, two blacksmith shops, a boat builder's shop, a sawmill and a shoe shop.

The Phillips and Rangeley Railroad, a narrow gauge common carrier, opened in 1891, becoming part of the Sandy River and Rangeley Lakes Railroad in 1908. Timber and other goods were shipped to markets, and tourists arrived from Boston; Hartford; New York City; and Philadelphia. Consequently, the region developed in the 1900s into a seasonal resort area with camps, cabins, summer homes, inns and hotels. The cool mountain climate and abundance of sport fishing made this a highly desirable and exclusive resort destination. Some inhabitants became fishing guides, and among the anglers was President Herbert Hoover. The big hotels would decline, however, with the end of the railroad and invention of the automobile and proliferation of roads leading to vacationers building personal camps. In 1958, The Rangeley Lake House was razed. But smaller motels and camp rentals have taken their place, and Rangeley remains a popular resort.

Geography

Centrally located between the headwaters of both the Androscoggin River and Kennebec River, the town lies on the eastern shores of Rangeley Lake in the Western Maine Mountains.  Smalls Falls, lying just south of the town on Route 4, is a popular tourist destination.  A sign in town notes that Rangeley is halfway between the Equator and North Pole.

Climate

This climatic region has large seasonal temperature differences, with warm (and often humid) summers and cold (sometimes severely cold) winters.  According to the Köppen Climate Classification system, Rangeley has a humid continental climate, abbreviated "Dfb" on climate maps. Similar to the rest of New England, snowfall is high in Rangeley, but due to the cold mean temperatures in winter, it remains on the ground for several months.  Summer temperatures are moderated by the elevation and are thus cooler than other nearby towns.

It is exceptionally rare for a station on the east side of the Americas to have its warmest measured temperature for more than half a century in early fall. Diurnal temperature variation is generally high, which means vast differences between day and night temperatures. Even considering this, Rangeley occasionally gets severe cold also during daytime.

Demographics

2010 census

As of the census of 2010, there were 1,168 people, 575 households, and 338 families residing in the town. The racial makeup of the town was 98.4% White, 0.5% Asian, 0.6% from other races, and 0.5% from two or more races. Hispanic or Latino of any race were 1.0% of the population.

There were 575 households, of which 19.7% had children under the age of 18 living with them, 47.1% were married couples living together, 7.7% had a female householder with no husband present, 4.0% had a male householder with no wife present, and 41.2% were non-families. Of all households, 34.1% were made up of individuals, and 16.1% had someone living alone who was 65 years of age or older. The average household size was 2.03 and the average family size was 2.56.

The median age in the town was 51.4 years. 16.2% of residents were under the age of 18; 4.8% were between the ages of 18 and 24; 18.1% were from 25 to 44; 35.6% were from 45 to 64; and 25.2% were 65 years of age or older. The gender makeup of the town was 50.8% male and 49.2% female.

2000 census

As of the census of 2000, there were 1,052 people, 468 households, and 292 families residing in the town. The population density was 25.3 people per square mile (9.8/km). The racial makeup of the town was 99.24% White, 0.10% Black or African American, 0.10% Native American, 0.10% from other races, and 0.48% from two or more races. Hispanic or Latino of any race were 0.19% of the population.

There were 468 households, out of which 24.1% had children under the age of 18 living with them, 51.9% were married couples living together, 7.1% had a female householder with no husband present, and 37.6% were non-families. Of all households, 30.3% were made up of individuals, and 14.1% had someone living alone who was 65 years of age or older.  The average household size was 2.24 individuals and the average family size was 2.79 people.

In the town, the population was spread out, with 21.3% under the age of 18; 4.4% from 18 to 24; 25.3% from 25 to 44; 28.3% from 45 to 64; and 20.7% who were 65 years of age or older.  The median age was 44 years. For every 100 females, there were 100.4 males.  For every 100 females age 18 and over, there were 97.1 males.

The median income for a household in the town was $33,382, and the median income for a family was $43,250. Males had a median income of $32,426 versus $19,519 for females. The per capita income for the town was $19,052.  About 9.3% of families and 11.7% of the population were below the poverty line, including 15.0% of those under age 18 and 10.1% of those age 65 or over.

Sites of interest

 Rangeley Maine
 Rangeley Lakes Region Logging Museum
 Wilhelm Reich Museum

Notable people

 Patrick Dempsey, actor
 Wilhelm Reich, psychiatrist
 Bing Russell, actor
 Kurt Russell, actor
 Arlo West, musician and photographer

References

External links

 Experience Rangeley Magazine – Your guide to all things Rangeley.
 Rangeley Public Library
 Rangeley Lakes Snowmobile Club
 Rangeley Lakes Region Maps, Town Information and Complete Directory of Businesses and Services
 Rangeley Maine Vacation, Tourism, and Recreation & Sports Information. Includes many photos of the area.
 Rangeley Maine News
 Rangeley Maine Events Calendar

Towns in Franklin County, Maine
Towns in Maine